
Gmina Szamocin is an urban-rural gmina (administrative district) in Chodzież County, Greater Poland Voivodeship, in west-central Poland.

Villages
Apart from the town of Szamocin, Gmina Szamocin contains the villages and settlements of Antoniny, Atanazyn, Borówki, Borowo, Heliodorowo, Jaktorówko, Jaktorowo, Józefowice, Józefowo, Józefy, Kosarzyn, Laskowo, Leśniczówka, Lipa, Lipia Góra, Mielimąka, Nadolnik, Nałęcza, Nowy Dwór, Nowy Młyn, Piłka, Raczyn, Śluza-Krostkowo, Sokolec, Strzelczyki, Swoboda, Szamoty and Weśrednik.

Neighbouring gminas
Gmina Szamocin is bordered by the gminas of Białośliwie, Chodzież, Gołańcz, Margonin, Miasteczko Krajeńskie and Wyrzysk.

References
Polish official population figures 2006

Szamocin
Chodzież County